Reza Shiran Khorasani is an Iranian conservative politician who represents Mashhad and Kalat electoral district in the Parliament of Iran since 2016.

References

 Official biography

1963 births
Living people
Members of the 10th Islamic Consultative Assembly
Deputies of Mashhad and Kalat
People from Mashhad

Progress and Justice Population of Islamic Iran politicians